The girls doubles tournament of the 2022 European Junior Badminton Championships was held from 22 to 27 August. Anastasiia Boiarun and Alena Iakovleva from Russia clinched this title in the last edition.

Seeds 
Seeds were announced on 5 August.

  Polina Buhrova / Yana Sobko
  Nikol Carulla / Lucia Rodriguez
  Malya Hoareau / Camille Pognante
  Selin Hübsch / Julia Meyer 

  Lisa Curtin / Estelle Van Leeuwen
  Lucie Amiguet / Vera Appenzeller 
  Lucie Krulová / Petra Maixnerová 
  Kirsten De Wit / Meerte Loos (second round)

Draw

Finals

Top half

Section 1

Section 2

Bottom half

Section 3

Section 4

References

External links 
Draw

2022 European Junior Badminton Championships